Shoppen is a 2006 German comedy film directed by Ralf Westhoff.

Cast 
 Sebastian Weber - Jörg
 Anna Böger - Susanne
 Felix Hellmann - Patrick
 Katharina Marie Schubert - Isabella 
  - Frank
 Julia Koschitz - Susanna
  - Markus
  - Miriam
  - Thorsten

References

External links 

2006 comedy films
2006 films
German comedy films
2000s German films